Brian Head may refer to:

Places
 Brian Head, Utah, a town
 Brian Head (mountain), a mountain in Utah, United States
 Brian Head Ski Resort

People
 Brian Head (composer) (born 1964), American composer, guitarist, and lecturer
 Brian Head (sociologist), Australian sociologist who defined the concept of cultural cringe
 Brian Head (Manitoba politician)

Head, Brian